Patrick Collins (1911–1994) was one of Ireland's foremost painters of the 20th century. He was elected HRHA (Honorary Council of the Royal Hibernian Academy) in 1980 and a member of Aosdána in 1981 and had a major retrospective exhibition by the Irish Arts Council (Cork, Belfast, Dublin) in 1982. Several solo exhibitions followed, including a Retrospective at Sligo Art Gallery in 1985. Two years later, Patrick Collins was the first artist to be honoured with the accolade SAOI by Aosdána in recognition of his outstanding contribution to the visual arts in Ireland. In 1988 he received an Honorary Doctorate of Literature from Trinity College, Dublin. His paintings have been exhibited widely in Ireland and in Europe, and are held in many public and private collections of Irish painting worldwide.

"Patrick Collins has made a unique contribution to painting in our time by his power to evoke an aspect of Ireland which captures not only the primary image of the place and the people, but also its spiritual content. His grey-blue landscapes contain images of households, farms and figures, which emerge with a curious imprecise shape that is ultimately seen to be marked by folk-memory and by legend. Like a poet with words, his images penetrate areas beyond exact statement or description – they belong to the area of suggestion and imagination which cannot be identified outside the realm of his own idiom."
(James White, Chairman of the Arts Council in the foreword to "Patrick Collins" by Frances Ruane)

Life

Biographical outline

Exhibitions

Solo exhibitions

Selected group exhibitions

Works in collections
Irish National Gallery
Liffey Quaysides, 1957-8
Irish Arts Council:
Rising Swan
Small Holding on the Side of a Mountain
Children Playing 
Predator Bird
Atlantic Window
Rain on the Moon 
Oak Tree
Arts Council of Northern Ireland 
AIB Collection
Travelling Tinkers, 1968
A Place with Stones, 1979
Table with Exotic Fruit, 1976
Irish Museum of Modern Art (IMMA) Collection
Landscape with Declining Sun (1984)
The Wood Pigeon's Nest (1974)
Field of Old Stones (1978)
Bird Against the Window (1963)
Headland (1980)
Landscape with Church (1956)
Bank of Ireland Collection
Pigeon House (mouth of the Liffey), 1978
Trout Rising, 1978

See also
Irish art
List of Irish artists

References

1911 births
Saoithe
1994 deaths
20th-century Irish painters
Irish male painters
20th-century Irish male artists
People educated at St. Vincent's C.B.S., Glasnevin